The 1957 SCCA National Sports Car Championship season was the seventh season of the Sports Car Club of America's National Sports Car Championship. It began May 19, 1957, and ended November 17, 1957, after fifteen races.

Classes

Schedule

 Feature race

Season results
Feature race overall winners in bold.

 C Production were classified with B Production at Eagle Mountain.
 The feature race at Thompson was won overall by Bill Rutan in an Unrestricted-class Lester -MG.
 H Sports were classified with G Sports at Palm Springs.

Champions

References

External links
World Sports Racing Prototypes: SCCA 1957
Racing Sports Cars: SCCA archive
Etceterini: 1957 program covers

SCCA National Sports Car Championship
Scca National Sports Car Championship
1957 in American motorsport